Vicky Maeijer (born 7 September 1986) is a Dutch politician representing the Party for Freedom. She has been a member of the House of Representatives since 23 March 2017. Previously, she was a Member of the European Parliament for the Netherlands from 2014 to 2017.

Career
Maeijer obtained a bachelor's degree in Dutch law at the Erasmus University Rotterdam in 2009, and completed a master's degree in international and European public law at the same institution. Between 2007 and 2014 she worked at different times as a policy worker for the Party for Freedom party in the House of Representatives of the Netherlands and the European Parliament. She started working for Raymond de Roon and later became an aid to Louis Bontes. She entered the 2011 Dutch provincial elections as the lijsttrekker (top party candidate) for the Party for Freedom at age 24. She stated that she wanted the provincial government to focus on its main tasks of spatial planning, traffic and environment. Other stated issues were the decrease in provincial civil servants, a decrease in the number of members of the provincial State and provincial executive, and a publicly elected King's Commissioner.

Maeijer was a member of the States of South Holland between 17 March 2011 and 1 July 2014. For the 2012 general election she was number 21 on the Party for Freedom list. Until July 2014 she was the party leader in the States of South Holland. In the 2014 European Parliament elections Maeijer was elected for the Party for Freedom. In 2017, she was elected as a Member of the House of Representatives, she took office on 23 March.

Electoral history

References

External links
European Parliament page

1986 births
Living people
Erasmus University Rotterdam alumni
Members of the House of Representatives (Netherlands)
Members of the Provincial Council of South Holland
MEPs for the Netherlands 2014–2019
21st-century women MEPs for the Netherlands
Party for Freedom politicians
Party for Freedom MEPs
Politicians from Rotterdam
21st-century Dutch politicians
20th-century Dutch women